The Central District of Boshruyeh County is in South Khorasan province, Iran. At the National Census in 2006, the region's population (as a part of the former Boshruyeh District of Ferdows County) was 17,390 in 4,639 households. The following census in 2011 counted 18,840 people in 5,462 households, by which time the district had been separated from the county and Boshruyeh County established. At the latest census in 2016, the district had 20,091 inhabitants in 6,237 households.

References 

Boshruyeh County

Districts of South Khorasan Province

Populated places in South Khorasan Province

Populated places in Boshruyeh County